Pseudostenophylacinae is a subfamily of caddisfly.

Genera
 Aplatyphylax
 Astenophylina
 Astratodina
 Phylostenax
 Pseudostenophylax

References

Trichoptera subfamilies
Integripalpia